Cohoes Falls [Kahón:ios Kanien'ké:ha (Kanyenkeha or Mohawk language) for "a boat is in the water / is actively submerged"] is a waterfall on the Mohawk River shared by the city of Cohoes and the town of Waterford, New York.

Cohoes historian Arthur Masten incorrectly wrote in his 1880 history that the phrase might mean "Potholes in the River," referring to the potholes that appear in the riverbed when it is dry. However, Kanatsio'harè:ke (Kanatsiohareke) and Kanatsio'háre (Canojahare) bear names with reference to this meaning in Kanien'ké:ha (Kanyenkeha). 

In the oral and written tradition of the Haudenosaunee (Iroquois), Kahón:ios is where The Great Peacemaker performed a feat of supernatural strength, convincing the Kanyenkehaka (Mohawks) to become the founding nation of the Haudenosaunee Confederacy.  Some historians believe the Kanyenkehaka (Mohawks) launched the Confederacy as early as 1142 CE, though other experts report dates ranging from 1450–1650.

Celebrated by 18th-century travelers in letters and journals, Cohoes Falls, also called The Great Falls of the Mohawk, were regarded as the second-most beautiful cataract in New York State after Niagara Falls. In 1804, the national poet of Ireland, Thomas Moore, visited Cohoes and wrote a paean to the waterfall's beauty: "Lines Written at the Cohos, or Falls of the Mohawk River."

In 1831, town leaders built a dam across the Mohawk River to harness the power of the falls to fuel the turbines of the city's burgeoning textile industry.  Over the next several decades, the predominant company, Harmony Mills, became the largest manufacturer of cotton in the United States, thanks to its control of local water rights.  When all the mills closed in the wake of the Great Depression, city leaders leased the flow rights to a series of power companies, including Niagara Mohawk and Orion Power.

The Erie Canal was planned to overcome the navigational barrier of the Cohoes Falls.  The original "Clinton's Ditch", the Erie Canal of 1825, was built through the city of Cohoes.  The later Enlarged Canal was realigned, yet still went through the City of Cohoes.  The Barge Canal, which opened in 1918, bypasses Cohoes and runs through the Village of Waterford via the Waterford Flight of Locks.

The Cohoes Falls is 90 feet (28 m) high and 1,000 feet (305 m) wide. The flow varies with seasonal variation of Mohawk River flow as well as with diversions for the Barge Canal locks, power generation, and the Cohoes water supply. During the summer, the falls are virtually dry, revealing shale rock formations that have their own distinctive beauty. The 87-year average flow of the Mohawk River at Cohoes is 34,638 cubic feet per second, but this includes water diverted to the power plant and Erie Canal locks.

__toc__

Cohoes Falls compared to Niagara Falls
Water flow over Cohoes Falls ranges from zero to 90,000 cubic feet per second. (During Hurricane Irene in August 2011, the flow was estimated to be over 100,000 cubic feet per second with a total river flow of 117,000.)
Cohoes Falls generates about 190,000 megawatt hours (i.e. 190 gigawatt hours) of electricity a year. Niagara Falls produces about 2.4 gigawatts in New York and 2.0 gigawatts in Canada.
At Niagara Falls, the annual rate of tourism tops 28 million people. There is no tourist industry at Cohoes Falls.

Gallery

References

External links

Webcam of the Cohoes Falls

Cohoes, New York
Erie Canal
Waterfalls of New York (state)
Landforms of Saratoga County, New York
Landforms of Albany County, New York
Tourist attractions in Albany County, New York
Tourist attractions in Saratoga County, New York
Block waterfalls